Chaharduli may refer to:
 Chaharduli District
 Chaharduli Rural District (disambiguation)